Joseph Fernando (born 1 May 1995) is a Sri Lankan cricketer. He made his first-class debut for Panadura Sports Club in Tier B of the 2018–19 Premier League Tournament on 9 May 2019.

References

External links
 

1995 births
Living people
Sri Lankan cricketers
Panadura Sports Club cricketers
People from Negombo